Demián Bichir Nájera (born 1 August 1963) is a Mexican actor. After starring in telenovelas, he began to appear in Hollywood films. He was nominated for the Academy Award for Best Actor for his role in A Better Life.

Personal life
Bichir was born in Torreón. His parents are Alejandro Bichir and Maricruz Nájera. His paternal family is of Lebanese origin. His brothers are Odiseo and Bruno. He worked at the National Theater Company, performed Shakespeare and Dostoyevsky, and won several awards at the Mexican Association of Theater Critics. He attended the Lee Strasberg Theatre and Film Institute, and worked at Rosa Mexican Restaurant. He is an American Civil Liberties Union Ambassador of Immigration Rights. His wife, Stefanie Sherk, committed suicide by drowning in the swimming pool on 12 April 2019. Bichir has a daughter, Gala.

Career
Bichir played Fidel Castro in Che and an emigrant in A Better Life. He starred in the crime series The Bridge and the western film The Hateful Eight. His directorial debut film Un Cuento de Circo & A Love Song premiered at the Morelia International Film Festival. Other films including Alien: Covenant, The Nun and Chaos Walking. He starred in the remake series Grand Hotel. He stars in Angelina Jolie’s adapted film of Alessandro Baricco's novel Without Blood.

Filmography

Film

Television

Awards

Notes

References

External links

Radio interview with Demián Bichir on Fresh Air discussing The Bridge (38 mins, 2013)

1963 births
20th-century Mexican male actors
21st-century Mexican male actors
Living people
Male actors from Mexico City
Mexican emigrants to the United States
Mexican male child actors
Mexican male film actors
Mexican male stage actors
Mexican male telenovela actors
People from Torreón
People with acquired American citizenship